If I Told You may refer to:
 If I Told You (album), a 2006 album by Aoife Ní Fhearraigh, or the title song
 If I Told You (song), a 2016 song by Darius Rucker

See also
 If I Told You, You Were Beautiful, an album by Minor Majority